An All-American team is an honorary sports team composed of the best amateur players of a specific season for each team position—who in turn are given the honorific "All-America" and typically referred to as "All-American athletes", or simply "All-Americans". Although the honorees generally do not compete together as a unit, the term is used in U.S. team sports to refer to players who are selected by members of the national media. Walter Camp selected the first All-America team in the early days of American football in 1889. The 2022 NCAA Women's Basketball All-Americans are honorary lists that include All-American selections from the Associated Press (AP), the United States Basketball Writers Association (USBWA), and the Women's Basketball Coaches Association (WBCA) for the 2021–22 NCAA Division I women's basketball season. Both AP and USBWA choose three teams, while WBCA lists 10 honorees.

A consensus All-America team in women's basketball has never been organized. This differs from the practice in men's basketball, in which the NCAA uses a combination of selections by AP, USBWA, the National Association of Basketball Coaches (NABC), and Sporting News to determine a consensus All-America team. The selection of a consensus All-America men's basketball team is possible because all four organizations select at least a first and second team, with only the USBWA not selecting a third team.

Before the 2017–18 season, it was impossible for a consensus women's All-America team to be determined because the AP had been the only body that divided its women's selections into separate teams. The USBWA first named separate teams in 2017–18. The women's counterpart to the NABC, the Women's Basketball Coaches Association (WBCA), continues the USBWA's former practice of selecting a single 10-member (plus ties) team. Sporting News does not select an All-America team in women's basketball.

By selector

Associated Press (AP)  
Announced on March 16, 2022; listed in order of votes received. Of note:
 Rhyne Howard became the ninth player to be selected as a three-time first-team All-American.
 Aliyah Boston, Caitlin Clark, and NaLyssa Smith were unanimous first-team selections.
 Naz Hillmon and Haley Jones tied for the fifth spot, resulting in a six-member first team. This was the first such tie since the AP started selecting women's All-Americans in 1995.

AP Honorable Mention 

 Shakira Austin, Ole Miss
 Kierstan Bell, Florida Gulf Coast
 Katie Benzan, Maryland
 Grace Berger, Indiana
 Paige Bueckers, UConn
 Nia Clouden, Michigan State
 Jennifer Coleman, Navy
 Zia Cooke, South Carolina
 Monika Czinano, Iowa

 Jasmine Dickey, Delaware
 Emily Engstler, Louisville
 Dyaisha Fair, Buffalo
 Shaylee Gonzales, BYU
 Destanni Henderson, South Carolina
 Rori Harmon, Texas
 Jordan Horston, Tennessee
 Abby Meyers, Princeton

 Olivia Miles, Notre Dame
 Ashley Owusu, Maryland
 Cate Reese, Arizona
 Taylor Robertson, Oklahoma
 Jacy Sheldon, Ohio State
 Christyn Williams, UConn
 Macee Williams, IUPUI
 Katelyn Young, Murray State

United States Basketball Writers Association (USBWA) 
The USBWA announced its 15-member team, divided into first, second, and third teams, plus honorable mention selections, on March 17, 2022. Vote totals were not released.

USBWA Honorable Mention 

 Shakira Austin, Ole Miss
 Kierstan Bell, Florida Gulf Coast

 Grace Berger, Indiana
 Veronica Burton, Northwestern

 Angel Reese, Maryland
 Christyn Williams, UConn

Women's Basketball Coaches Association (WBCA) 
The WBCA announced its All-America team on March 31, 2022, with Aliyah Boston announced as the Wade Trophy recipient.

Academic All-Americans
The College Sports Information Directors of America (CoSIDA; renamed in September 2022 as College Sports Communicators) announced its 2022 Academic All-America team on March 16, 2022, divided into first, second and third teams, with Aliyah Boston of South Carolina chosen as women's college basketball Academic All-American of the Year for the second straight season. Due to a tie for the fifth spot on the second team, the overall team had 16 members instead of the usual 15.

Senior All-Americans
The 10 finalists for the Senior CLASS Award, called Senior All-Americans, were announced on February 10, 2022. Lexie Hull of Stanford was announced as the recipient on March 31, with the first and second teams also announced at that time.

First team

Second team

References

All-Americans
NCAA Women's Basketball All-Americans